Nagatoki (written: 長時) is a masculine Japanese given name. Notable people with the name include:

 (1227–1264), Japanese regent
 (1519–1583), Japanese daimyō

Japanese masculine given names